NMHS may refer to:


High schools

United States
 North Medford High School, Oregon
 North Mecklenburg High School, North Carolina
 North Mesquite High School , Texas
 Newark Memorial High School, California
 New Milford High School (disambiguation), several schools in the U.S.

Other countries
 Naples Middle/High School, Gricignano di Aversa, Italy
 Norwood Morialta High School, former name of Norwood International High School, Adelaide, Australia

Other uses
 National Maritime Historical Society, an American non-profit organization